Johannes Frey (born 12 November 1996) is a German judoka.

He is the silver medallist of the 2020 Judo Grand Slam Düsseldorf and is scheduled to represent Germany at the 2020 Summer Olympics.

References

External links
 

1996 births
Living people
German male judoka
European Games competitors for Germany
Judoka at the 2019 European Games
Judoka at the 2020 Summer Olympics
Olympic judoka of Germany
Medalists at the 2020 Summer Olympics
Olympic medalists in judo
Olympic bronze medalists for Germany
21st-century German people
20th-century German people